Circobotys elegans is a moth in the family Crambidae. It was described by Eugene G. Munroe and Akira Mutuura in 1969. It is found in Taiwan.

See also 
 List of moths of Taiwan

References

External links 

 Circobotys elegans on www.boldsystems.org
 Circobotys elegans on globalspecies.org
 Circobotys elegans on data.gbif.org
 Circobotys elegans on eol.org

Pyraustinae
Moths described in 1969